Mardaliç Island (also called "Corci Island" ) is an Aegean island of Turkey.

Location
The island faces Narlıdere Bay in mainland  Anatolia. The island measures 2.1 square kilometres.

History
In the antiquity the island was known as Elaiousa Erythraion.  
In the 14th century the island was a part of the Republic of Genoa. Francesco I Gattilusio and his successors controlled Lesbos and the smaller islands around like Mardaliç for about a century. In 1462 Mahmut Pasha of the Ottoman Empire captured the island. But soon the island became a pirates' island. Especially Georgia Maria from the island Corsica who allied himself with the Republic of Venice became a big problem for the people living in the coastal area of west Anatolia. In 17th century Ottoman navy recaptured the island. Corci, the alternative name of the island is a corrupt form of the name Georgia.

The island today
The island is uninhabited. But there are some ruins from Genoa era. Most important ruin is an observation tower. Birds such as sea gull and partridge as well as some snakes and lizards make up the fauna of the island.  Olive, thyme and scale fern are some of the plants.

References

Aegean islands
Islands of Turkey
Islands of İzmir Province
Dikili District